The Chambres des Comptes de Navarre, alias Cour des Comptes de Navarre (English: Court of Auditors of Navarre), was formed in April 1624 during the reign of Louis XIII through the act of merging the Chambre des Comptes of Pau with the Chambre des Comptes of Nérac into one entity. In 1691, it was merged into the Parliament of Navarre and Béarn in Pau. The First President and the two Presidents, became Président à mortiers in the Parliament.

The Chambre des Comptes of Pau and the Chambre des Comptes of Nérac were created at the same time by Henry II of Navarre on 4 January 1527,

Chambre des Comptes in Pau 

The Chambre des Comptes in Pau was given responsibility for Lower Navarre, Béarn, the County of Foix and Bigorre, the Viscounties of Marsan, Turson, Gavardon and the Barony of Captieux, the Viscounties of Lautrec and Nébouzan, the Barony of After-Villemure, and the four valleys of the Aure.

It was reconfirmed and authorized by his successor, Antoine of Navarre, on 11 September 1560, who made at the same time a number of laws to set out the powers of the officers, not only for the Chambre des Comptes in Pau, but also for those of Nérac and Vendôme.

Among these laws were those that determined the number of officers that each one had to have, namely one President, five Counselors/Auditors, a Registrar, a Huissier and a Patrimonial Prosecutor (a "Procureur Patrimonial"); the jurisdiction and knowledge were set forth for all matters concerning the types of income and expense accounting, and the circumstances and dependencies, all the same, and with the same authority and justice that had belonged to the King himself.

By 28 October 1563, the number of huissiers had been increased to two.

The number of counselors/auditors was increased to six with the addition of a position of Supernumerary on 28 October 1563, but the first such supernumerary was only installed in office on 3 January 1568.

On 30 September 1569, the Queen Regnant Jeanne published new laws about religion with two main principles: the first being to suspend all officers who were not Huguenot and prohibit the Lieutenant General from enlisting Catholics, and the second being to seize the property and assets, ecclesiastical or secular, of those who disobeyed her and to sell them on public auction. This latter is, in essence, the beginning of war in Béarn.

First Presidents 
First Presidents of the Chambres des Comptes of Pau (in chronological order):

Procureur Patrimonial

Prosecutor and Attorney Generals 

 Martin Legros

Attorney General (following the separation of the positions):

 N...Lamotte
 Guillaume Dareau
 Jean d'Esquille
 Pierre Garros, in 1571
 Jean de Lendresse, 21 September 1583
 Pierre Dupont, 31 October 1584
 Charles Dupont, 31 October 1619

Chambre des Comptes in Nérac 

In addition to the responsibility for the Duchy of Albret at the time it was formed, it was also responsible for the County of Armagnac and all of its dependent territories, the Pays d'Eaussan, the Seigneurie of Rivière-Basse, the County of Rodez, the four Castellans of Rouergue, the County of Périgord, and the Viscounty of Limoges.

First Presidents 
First Presidents of the Chambres des Comptes of Nérac (in chronological order):

Chambre des Comptes in Vendômes

Table Footnotes

Notes

References 
 

 

 

 

 

 

 

 

 

 

 

1624 establishments in Europe
Legal history of the Ancien Régime